Lac de Calacuccia is a reservoir in the Haute-Corse department of France formed by damming the Golo river.
It provides hydroelectric power and water for irrigation in the dry season.

Location

The Lac de Calacuccia is formed by damming the Golo river just south of the village of Calacuccia.
The eastern part of the reservoir is in the canton of Calacuccia while the western part is in the commune of Casamaccioli.
The northwest of the reservoir, where the Golo enters, is in the commune of Albertacce.
Other inflows include the Ruisseau de Lavertacce and Ruisseau de Ruggi from the south, and the Ruisseau di u Mulinellu, Ruisseau de Sialari and Ruisseau de Vergoleilu from the north.

The lake is in the upper Golo valley in the heart of the Niolu region, a wild micro-region of the Parc naturel régional de Corse (Corsica Regional Natural Park).
Surrounding peaks include Paglia Orba, Cinque Frati and Monte Cinto.
The climate differs from the rest of Corsica due to its position in the center of the island and the surrounding high peaks.
Summers are dry but cool, while winters are wet and temperate.

Ecology

The reservoir is of low biological interest.
Flora includes Spanish juniper (Juniperus thurifera).
Fauna include Geoffroy's bat  (Myotis emarginatus), carrion crow (Corvus corone cornix), brown trout (Salmo trutta) and great green bush-cricket (Tettigonia viridissima).

Dam

In August 1964 five hundred people led by all the elected representatives of the canton of Corte demonstrated against construction of the dam.
They proclaimed "their fierce determination to oppose by all means in their power to the realization of this project, which, in its current conception, would lead to the ruin of the valley of their ancestors and cradle of their children".
The dam would submerge  of land, or which a quarter was planted with gardens and orchards.
However, in January 1964 the departmental assembly had voted 52 to 5 in favour of the concessions requested by Électricité de France and the semi-public Société d'aménagement pour la mise en valeur de la Corse (Somivac) for the agricultural development of Corsica.

The Barrage de Calacuccia is a multiple arch dam used for hydroelectricity.
The concrete dam was built between 1965 and 1968.
It came into service in 1968. 
The dam impounds  of water.
Fish cannot pass the dam.

The water is fed to turbines in two power plants in Corscia and Castirla, then returned to the Golo.
The Barrage de Calacuccia is the most powerful hydroelectric facility in Corsica, generating 57 MW of the total 199 MW produced by hydroelectricity on the island.
It provides 10% of the electricity consumed in Corsica.
Every year  of water are allocated to irrigation of cultivated land.

Notes

Sources

Reservoirs of Haute-Corse